Bela zenetouae is a species of sea snail, a marine gastropod mollusk in the family Mangeliidae.

Distribution
This species is found in the Mediterranean Sea off Greece and Italy.

References

 Van Aartsen JJ 1988a European Mollusca: notes on less well-known species. XII. Bela menkhorsti nom. nov. = Pleurotoma nana Scacchi, 1836 not Deshayes, 1835 and Fehria (nov. gen.) zenetouae nov. spec. La Conchiglia 20 (232–233): 30–31
 Gofas, S.; Le Renard, J.; Bouchet, P. (2001). Mollusca, in: Costello, M.J. et al. (Ed.) (2001). European register of marine species: a check-list of the marine species in Europe and a bibliography of guides to their identification. Collection Patrimoines Naturels, 50: pp. 180–213

External links
 Biolib.cz: Image of a shell of Bela zenetouae

zenetouae